"Träume lebe ewig" is the second single off Christina Stürmer's acoustic album, laut-Los. Translated into English, it means "Dreams Live Forever."

Charts 
The song reached number ten in Austria but failed to meet the same success in Germany, reaching number forty on the charts there.

Music video 
The video starts with Stürmer lying in a chalk-lined bed. Shots of her and her band performing as shown. Stürmer is then shown at an outside café. Throughout the video, shots of Stürmer singing and looking out the window are shown.

2008 singles
Christina Stürmer songs
Songs written by Thorsten Brötzmann
Songs written by Lukas Loules
2008 songs
Polydor Records singles